John William Thompson (1888 – after 1911) was an English professional footballer who played as a winger for Sunderland.

References

1888 births
People from Alnwick
Footballers from Northumberland
English footballers
Association football wingers
Alnwick Town A.F.C. players
North Shields F.C. players
Sunderland A.F.C. players
Preston North End F.C. players
English Football League players
1984 deaths